Siddu from Sikakulam (alternate spelling: Sidhu from Srikakulam) is a 2008 Indian Telugu-language romantic comedy film written and directed by Eashwar, produced by Malla Vijayaprasad under Welfare Creations banner and starring Allari Naresh, Manjari Phadnis and Shraddha Das in lead roles. The film soundtrack and background score were composed by K. M. Radha Krishnan. Dialogues for the film were written by Raju M Rajasimha. The film was released on 14 August 2008.

Plot
Siddhu (Allari Naresh) is a young man who hails from Srikakulam, Andhra Pradesh. To pursue his education he joins a college in Visakhapatnam. There he meets and eventually falls in love with a girl called Sailaja (Manjari Phadnis). After a couple of encounters between the two,  Siddhu reveals his love to Sailaja and she too accepts his love. A few days after the incident, the college declares vacations. On the last of the college, Sailaja reveals that her father Obul Reddy (Jaya Prakash Reddy), a big time factionist has settled her marriage with Bhuma Reddy's (Vijayaranga Raju) brother. On learning about Obul Reddy, Siddhu tells Sailaja that it would be better to break up than continue their love as he doesn't want to lose his life over love. He thinks everything practically and reveals his decision. However, Sailaja agrees to separate from him on one condition that Siddhu should come to her marriage and stay with her till the tying of knot by the bridegroom, that too with a smiling face. Siddhu accepts her condition and reaches her village. He withstands his emotions and the teasing of Sailaja. At one stage, Siddhu also tries to tease Sailaja by becoming intimate with her sexually attractive cousin Nisha (Shraddha Das). However, eventually he tells everyone that he loves Sailaja  and can not live without her. He finally understands that love is greater than life and he is ready to sacrifice his life for the sake of love. At the same time, using his intelligence he creates a situation where Sailaja's father himself comes to Siddhu and asks him to marry his daughter. Siddhu marries Sailaja  with the acceptance of everyone in her family.

Cast 

 Allari Naresh as Siddhu
 Manjari Phadnis as Sailaja
 Shraddha Das as Nisha
 Jaya Prakash Reddy as Obul Reddy
 Dharmavarapu Subramanyam as Parasuram, a police inspector.
 Kondavalasa Lakshmana Rao as Konda, police constable.
 M. S. Narayana as Rataiah, Obul Reddy's henchmen.
 Venumadhav as Apple, Siddhu's friend
 Vijaya Rangaraju as Bhooma Reddy
 L.B. Sriram as Village priest
 Ahuti Prasad as Obul Reddy's brother
 Kallu Chidambaram as Gannavaram
 Khayyum as Siddhu's friend.
 Kadambari Kiran
 Surekha Vani
 Nalla Venu as Dose Babu, servant at Obul Reddy's house.
 Chandra Mohan as Siddhu's father
 Telangana Shakuntala as Bhooma Reddy's sister
 Satyam Rajesh
 Master Bharath
 Krishna Bhagavaan

Reception
The film was released on 14 August 2008 to negative reviews. Reviewer from IndiaGlitz commented that despite the best efforts of Allari Naresh to keep the film on a hit track, the poor narration left the film as an average to below average flick. Reviewer from Cinegoer.com gave a 1 of 5 star rating for the film and commented that the pace of the film was really slow and the movie has little to offer and music or performances are nothing special as well.

Soundtrack

The soundtrack of the film was composed by K. M. Radha Krishnan. The audio was launched on 25 July 2008 at Prasad Labs in Hyderabad. The audio was released under Supreme Music label.

References

External links 
 

2008 films
Indian comedy films
2000s Telugu-language films
2008 comedy films
Films scored by K. M. Radha Krishnan